Norvelle may refer to:

Norvelle, West Virginia, an unincorporated community in Raleigh County
Duncan Norvelle, an English comedian